This page documents the tornadoes and tornado outbreaks of 1979, primarily in the United States. Most tornadoes form in the U.S., although some events may take place internationally. Tornado statistics for older years like this often appear significantly lower than modern years due to fewer reports or confirmed tornadoes.

Synopsis

Numbers for 1979 were similar to that of 1980. Deaths were near normal, but injuries were above normal.

Events

January
16 tornadoes were reported in the U.S. in January, of which all were confirmed.

February
4 tornadoes were reported in the U.S. in January, of which all were confirmed.

March
53 tornadoes were reported in the U.S. in March.

March 18

On March 18, a minor outbreak swept across Texas, Oklahoma, and Kansas. The strongest tornado was an F3 that struck Copan, Oklahoma. An F2 tornado hit Catoosa, Oklahoma, a suburb of Tulsa.

March 29

On March 29, tornadoes touched down across Iowa and Illinois, including an F4 tornado that hit Braddyville, Iowa. An F0 struck a small suburb of Denver.

April
123 tornadoes were reported in the U.S. in April.

April 10–12

A large tornado outbreak also called "Terrible Tuesday", broke out in Texas and Oklahoma. Several deadly tornadoes occurred, including an F4 that decimated buildings in Wichita Falls, killing 42 people. An F2 tornado was notable for killing one person when it struck a mobile home park in Boonville, Indiana. A tornado killed three people in Lawton, Oklahoma. Overall, there were 58 deaths and over 2,000 injuries.

May
There were 112 tornadoes reported in the U.S. in May.

June
150 tornadoes were reported in the U.S. in June.

June 28
A small, but deadly outbreak of tornadoes broke out in Iowa and Minnesota, including an F4 that killed three people in Manson, Iowa.

July
132 tornadoes were reported in the U.S. in July.

July 16
An F3 tornado struck Cheyenne, Wyoming causing one fatality and 40 injuries. The tornado first to receive national attention by videotape as it ripped apart 500 homes.

August
126 tornadoes were reported in the U.S. in August.

August 7 (Canada)

At least three tornadoes touched down in Woodstock, Ontario, killing two people and injuring 142 others.

September
69 tornadoes were reported in the U.S. in September.

September 5

An F3 tornado touched down in Tysons, Virginia, killing one person.

October
47 tornadoes were reported in the U.S. in October.

October 3

An F4 tornado touched down in Windsor Locks, Connecticut, being a very rare New England tornado. The tornado was ranked as one of the costliest tornadoes in U.S. history, killing three people.

November
21 tornadoes were reported in the U.S. in November.

December
2 tornadoes were reported in the U.S. in December.

See also
 Tornado
 Tornadoes by year
 Tornado records
 Tornado climatology
 Tornado myths
 List of tornado outbreaks
 List of F5 and EF5 tornadoes
 List of North American tornadoes and tornado outbreaks
 List of 21st-century Canadian tornadoes and tornado outbreaks
 List of European tornadoes and tornado outbreaks
 List of tornadoes and tornado outbreaks in Asia
 List of Southern Hemisphere tornadoes and tornado outbreaks
 List of tornadoes striking downtown areas
 Tornado intensity
 Fujita scale
 Enhanced Fujita scale

References

External links
 U.S. tornadoes in 1979 - Tornado History Project

 
1979 meteorology
Tornado-related lists by year
Torn